Thorrur is a gram panchayat and village in [[hetaeni
|Hayanth Nagar]] mandal in Ranga Reddy district in the state of Telangana  in India. It is one of the rapidly growing villages in Ranga Reddy District.

Local governing body and politics 
Thorrur is in a major gram panchayath in Hayath Nagar Mandal in Ranga Reddy District. The village of Thorrur currently falls under Ibrahimpatnam assembly constituency and in Bhongir parliamentary constituency.  Till 2008, Thorrur had been in Malakpet assembly constituency. The village has seen phenomenal developments in the recent past in the mandal.
Thorrur is known for its interesting political activity and is the center of attraction of politics and political leaders in the mandal as well as the district.  The current MLA Malreddy Rangareddy hails from the village.  Many other leaders belonging to the local governing bodies have also contributed to the development of the village in their own ways.

Demographics and languages 
Thorrur is geographically located at 17°17'22"N 78°36'50"E.
Thorrur has a population of around 7,000 people. People of all castes and sects reside here, the primary occupation being agriculture.  The recent upswing in the real estate development had a positive impact on the living conditions of the people.  The primary languages spoken by people are Telugu basically with a Telangana dialect, Hindi, Urdu and English.
The famous Sanghi Temple is 10 km from Thorrur.  Also the renowned Ramoji film city is also 12 km from Thorrur.  There is a bypass road which goes through Thorrur to each of these places.

Temples 
Thorrur is well known for a 200-year-old Renuka Ellamma temple and is a popular temple shrine for devotees and visitors in the village.  The bonalu festival is a major annual festival which is celebrated at the Renuka Ellamma and Pochmma temples. Devotees from many places in the mandal and district throng during the Bonalu festive season and perform pujas to Goddesses Renuka Ellamma and Pochamma.  The famous bonalu jatara is feast to watch.
Other prominent Temples in Thorrur include Mallana Temple (Mallikarujuna swami), Ranganayakula Temple, Renuka Pochhamma Temple, Hanuman Temple, and Berrapa Temple.

Rajiv Gruhakalpa Colony 

The A.P. housing board and state government has provided a great housing colony with basic facilities to the poor people who lived in Hyderabad from many years and don't have own house so far. The Colony is named as Rajiv Gruhakalpa colony. Around 35 building blocks were constructed and each block consists 32 flats (16-16 of either side) and they have been allotted to the registered and deserved families at the sustainable prices. People who are living in this colony belong to the various areas in Hyderabad and they have fulfilled their desire of their own house from this scheme.

Surya Nagar Colony 

Suryanagar colony situated in thorror village around 40 independent residential constructed houses. The people who are living in this colony belong to the various areas in Andhra pradesh and Telangana.

Transportation 
Transportation is available to Thorrur from various places in Hyderabad and Secunderabad. TSRTC runs busses from  Hayath Nagar, Kothi, Dilsukhnagar, Secunderabad and Jublee Bus station to Thorrur.  The roads have been well laid and the infrastructure well developed for transportation. The TSRTC bus route numbers are as follows:

1. 202B   [Brahmana Palli to Women's College]
2. 202T   [Thorrur to Women's College]
3. 293s   [Sanghi Nagar to Women's College via Thorrur, RGK, Injapur, Sagar Ring Road, Karmanghat, Saidabad, Malakpet]
4. 290T/S [Thorur to Secunderabad(Chilakalaguda X Roads via Hayathnagar Depot, Sushma, Panama, L.B. Nagar, Uppal, Tarnaka]

References 

Villages in Ranga Reddy district